Chany is an urban locality (a work settlement) and the administrative center of Chanovsky District of Novosibirsk Oblast, Russia. Population:

References

Urban-type settlements in Novosibirsk Oblast